Renzo Compagna (born 1896) was an Italian fencer. He competed in the individual épée competition at the 1924 Summer Olympics.

References

External links
 

1896 births
Year of death missing
Italian male fencers
Olympic fencers of Italy
Fencers at the 1924 Summer Olympics